The 2014 Greater Sudbury municipal election was held on October 27, 2014 to elect a mayor and 12 city councillors in Greater Sudbury, Ontario. In addition, school trustees were elected to the Rainbow District School Board, Sudbury Catholic District School Board, Conseil scolaire de district du Grand Nord de l'Ontario and Conseil scolaire de district catholique du Nouvel-Ontario.

The election was held in conjunction with those held in other municipalities in the province of Ontario. For other elections, see 2014 Ontario municipal elections.

Candidate registration opened on January 2, 2014. The last day for candidate registration was September 12, 2014; although the offices of mayor and all twelve city council seats saw contested elections, some candidates for election to the school boards were declared acclaimed to office on that date as no opposing candidates registered by the deadline.

For the first time in the city's history, the 2014 election included an online voting option as part of efforts to increase voter turnout.

Issues
The predominant election issue was the functioning of Greater Sudbury City Council in the 2010-14 term. Under mayor Marianne Matichuk, who was widely criticized as lacking the leadership skills necessary to build a working coalition of support for her agenda, the council's work frequently bogged down in a state of political gridlock.

In addition, the council faced extensive criticism for its 2013 decision to refuse oversight from the Ontario Ombudsman's office, as well as the management of community development funds, disbursed by city councillors, which have been widely criticized as having the potential to be misused as political slush funds.

In conjunction with the election, a municipal referendum was held on the issue of deregulating retail store hours in Greater Sudbury, which was one of the few cities in Ontario where retail stores were still not permitted to open on Boxing Day. Matichuk had pledged to deregulate store hours in the 2010 election, although her motion to do so failed when she presented it to council on February 9, 2011; the referendum was approved by council in September 2012.

A poll conducted by Oraclepoll Research for the city's Northern Life newspaper found that despite the transparency and government effectiveness issues that had dominated the municipal political scene over the previous term, basic pocketbook issues such as road maintenance and property taxes were most commonly identified by voters as their main priorities in the election, with integrity and ethics ranking as the top priority for only a small minority of voters.

Mayoral race
In the early months of the campaign, Matichuk's silence about her reelection plans gave rise to media speculation that Premier Kathleen Wynne planned to appoint Matichuk as the Ontario Liberal Party's candidate in the provincial electoral district of Sudbury for the 2014 provincial election. Both Wynne and Matichuk denied the reports; however, the speculation failed to die down because of Matichuk's continued lack of clarity about her plans, and the local Liberal riding association's inability to get a firm date commitment for its nomination meeting from the party's head office. The party finally nominated Andrew Olivier as its candidate on May 8. In addition, virtually all of the major figures from Matichuk's 2010 campaign team publicly declared that they would not participate in a 2014 campaign on her behalf.

Matichuk announced on June 19 that she would not run for a second term as mayor. Despite the controversies that marred her first term in office, however, Oraclepoll Research's first poll of the race, released on June 24, 2014, suggested that she still held a healthy lead over any of the declared candidates among decided voters, with 38.1 per cent support.

Former mayor John Rodriguez, who was defeated by Matichuk in the 2010 election, registered as a candidate for mayor on May 9. The other declared candidates were Jean-Raymond Audet; Jeanne Brohart; Brian Bigger, who took leave from his job as the city's auditor to mount his campaign; Ron Dupuis, the incumbent city councillor for Ward 5 (Valley East); Jeff Huska, a biomedical engineering technologist at Health Sciences North; Richard Majkot, a retired former staffer at Toronto City Hall; Dan Melanson, the former president of a local taxpayers' lobby association who was himself an advisor to Matichuk's campaign in 2010; and Ed Pokonzie and David Popescu, both perennial candidates in the Sudbury area.

Opinion polls
Percentages of decided vote.

Election results

Referendum
In conjunction with the municipal election, three referendum questions on store hours in the city were posed to voters.

The referendum results were not legally binding on the city, as participation on all three questions fell slightly short of 50 per cent of registered voters; although the overall election passed 50 per cent voter turnout, the referendum questions garnered only 47 per cent participation. Some voters who were opposed to the proposal reportedly opted to abstain from the referendum questions, out of the mistaken perception that rather than bouncing the issue back to city council again, a failure to achieve 50 per cent turnout would make it legally impossible for any change in store hours to take place at all.

Mayor-elect Brian Bigger and several of the new councillors stated that they considered the result to be a sufficient mandate to proceed with deregulation of store hours, and the city's store hours bylaw was repealed at the new council's first official business meeting on December 9, 2014.

Question 1
Are you in favour of retail business establishments having the choice to open to the public on December 26?

Question 2
Are you in favour of retail business establishments having the choice to open to the public on the Civic Holiday, the first Monday in August?

Question 3
Are you in favour of allowing retail business establishments to choose the hours when they are open to the public?

Council

Ward 1
Ward 1 was an open seat, as former councillor Joe Cimino was elected to the Legislative Assembly of Ontario in the 2014 provincial election.

Ward 2

Ward 3

Ward 3 was an open seat after Claude Berthiaume announced his retirement from politics.

Ward 4

Richard Paquette was a registered candidate, but withdrew his candidacy for personal reasons in April.

Ward 5
Ward 5 was an open seat, as incumbent councillor Ron Dupuis was a candidate in the mayoral race.

Ward 6

Ward 7

Frank Mazzuca, Jr. was a registered candidate, but withdrew on May 22, 2014.

Ward 8

Ward 9

Ward 10

Ward 11

Ward 12

Rainbow District School Board

Zone 1
Zone 1 consists of Wards 1 and 2 in the city.

Zone 2
Zone 2 consists of Wards 3 and 4 in the city, as well as much of the Unorganized North Sudbury District north of the city, including the townships of Cartier, Cascaden, Foy, Hart, Harty, Hess, Moncrieff, Shining Tree and Trill.

Zone 3
Zone 3 consists of Wards 5 and 6 in the city.

Zone 4
Zone 4 consists of Wards 7 and 8 in the city, as well as the outlying municipalities of French River, Killarney, Markstay-Warren and St. Charles, and the unorganized townships of Burwash, Cox, Davis, Eden, Hawley, Hendrie, Henry, James, Laura, Loughrin, Secord, Servos, Street and Tilton.

Zone 5
Zone 5 consists of Wards 9 and 10 in the city.

Zone 6
Zone 6 consists of Wards 11 and 12 in the city.

Sudbury Catholic District School Board

Zone 1
Zone 1 consists of Wards 1 and 2 in the city.

Zone 2
Zone 2 consists of Wards 3 and 4 in the city, as well as much of the Unorganized North Sudbury District north of the city, including the townships of Cartier, Cascaden, Foy, Hart, Harty, Hess, Moncrieff, Shining Tree and Trill.

Zone 3
Zone 3 consists of Wards 5 and 6 in the city.

Zone 4
Zone 4 consists of Wards 7 and 8 in the city, as well as the outlying municipalities of Markstay-Warren and St. Charles.

Zone 5
Zone 5 consists of Wards 9 and 10 in the city, as well as the outlying municipalities of French River and Killarney, and the unorganized townships of Burwash, Cox, Davis, Eden, Hawley, Henvey, Hendrie, Henry, James, Laura, Loughrin, Secord, Servos, Street, Tilton and Wallbridge.

Zone 6
Zone 6 consists of Wards 11 and 12 in the city.

Cameron was subsequently removed from office on March 30, 2015, after failing to file his financial statements from the 2014 election by the filing deadline of March 27; even though Cameron had been acclaimed to his seat and thus had no campaign expenses to report, he was still legally required to file a statement formally declaring his lack of expenses. Calling the matter an accidental oversight, Cameron appealed the decision and was reinstated as trustee and board chair in April.

Conseil scolaire public du Grand Nord de l'Ontario

Zone 7

Zone 8

Zone 9

Zone 10

Zone 11

Zone 12

Conseil scolaire de district catholique du Nouvel-Ontario

Zone 4
Two to be elected.

Zone 5
Two to be elected.

Zone 6
Two to be elected.

References

External links
City of Greater Sudbury Municipal Elections 2014

2014 Ontario municipal elections
2014